Rameh may refer to:
 Rameh-ye Bala, Semnan Province
 Rameh-ye Pain, Semnan Province
 Rameh, South Khorasan